Scanners is a 1981 Canadian science fiction horror film written and directed by David Cronenberg and starring Stephen Lack, Jennifer O'Neill, Michael Ironside, and Patrick McGoohan. In the film, "scanners" are psychics with unusual telepathic and telekinetic powers. ConSec, a purveyor of weaponry and security systems, searches out scanners to use them for its own purposes. The film's plot concerns the attempt by Darryl Revok (Ironside), a renegade scanner, to wage a war against ConSec. Another scanner, Cameron Vale (Lack), is dispatched by ConSec to stop Revok.

Scanners premiered in January 1981 to lukewarm reviews from critics but became one of the first films produced in Canada to successfully compete with American films at the international box office. It brought Cronenberg and his controversial style of body horror attention from mainstream film audiences for the first time and has since been reevaluated as a cult classic. It is particularly well known for a scene that depicts Revok psychically causing a rival scanner's head to explode.

Plot
Cameron Vale is a downtrodden vagrant who suffers from voices manifesting in his head. After involuntarily causing a woman to have a seizure with his telepathy, Vale is captured by the private military company ConSec and brought to Dr. Paul Ruth, who explains that Vale is one of 237 super-powered individuals known as "scanners" capable of telepathy, empathy, biokinesis, and psychokinesis. Ruth injects Vale with a drug called "ephemerol," which restores his sanity by temporarily inhibiting his scanning ability, and teaches him to control his abilities. ConSec is attempting to recruit scanners to stop a malevolent underground ring of scanners led by Darryl Revok, a former mental patient who trepanned his own skull to cope with the same uncontrollable stream of thoughts. Ruth explains that Revok's uncontrolled powers drove him mad and asks Vale to help infiltrate Revok's group. Revok, who is killing all opposing scanners, infiltrates a ConSec marketing event and psychically explodes the head of a domesticated ConSec scanner. ConSec security head Braedon Keller advocates shutting down ConSec's scanner research program but Ruth, who believes the scanners' abilities are the next stage of human evolution, disagrees and notes that the assassination demonstrates Revok's danger. Ruth brings in Vale and asks him to help infiltrate Revok's group.

Unknown to Ruth, Keller is working for Revok as a mole and informs him of Ruth's infiltration plan. Revok dispatches assassins to follow Vale as he visits an unaffiliated scanner named Benjamin Pierce, a successful yet reclusive sculptor who copes with his abilities through his art. Revok's assassins murder Pierce, but Vale reads Pierce's dying brain and learns of a group of scanners, led by Kim Obrist, who oppose Revok's group. Vale tracks down Obrist and attends a meeting, but Revok's assassins strike again; only Vale and Obrist survive. Vale learns of a pharmaceutical company, Biocarbon Amalgamate, which he soon discovers Revok is using to distribute large quantities of ephemerol under a ConSec computer program called "Ripe." Vale and Obrist return to ConSec to investigate, and Ruth admits that he founded Biocarbon Amalgamate and suggests Vale cyberpathically scan the computer system to learn more. Keller attacks Obrist and kills Ruth while Vale and Obrist flee the ConSec building. Vale cyberpathically hacks into the computer network through a telephone booth and downloads ephemerol shipment information directly into his mind. Keller is killed when the computer explodes during his attempt to intercept Vale.

Vale and Obrist visit a doctor on the list of ephemerol recipients, where they discover that it is being prescribed to pregnant women, causing their children to become scanners. Revok and his men ambush and abduct Vale and Obrist, taking them to the Biocarbon Amalgamate plant. Revok reveals to Vale that they are both Ruth's children, and their father developed ephemerol as a sedative for pregnant women; Ruth learned about the drug's side-effect during his wife's pregnancies, and he made them the most powerful scanners in the world by administering a prototype dosage prior to abandoning them. Revok plans to create and lead a new generation of scanners to take over the world by mass-distributing ephemerol, but Vale refuses to join the plot accusing Revok of acting like his father, causing him to become enraged. A telepathic duel ensues between the brothers, during the course of which Vale's body is destroyed and burned. However, when Obrist encounters Revok, his head scar has vanished, his eyes are now blue, and he speaks in Vale's voice; Vale had somehow managed to switch his consciousness with Revok's at the last minute.

Cast

William Hope, Christopher Britton, and Leon Herbert have uncredited appearances as Bicarbon Amalgamate employees. Neil Affleck has a minor role as a medical student.

Production
Scanners was based on David Cronenberg's scripts The Sensitives and Telepathy 2000, which he planned to pitch to Roger Corman before beginning work on The Brood. Cronenberg has called Scanners one of his most difficult films to make; most Canadian film productions of the 1970s and the early 1980s were funded through a 100-percent Capital Cost Allowance tax shield for investors passed by Prime Minister Pierre Trudeau in 1974, and the film was rushed into production without a finished script or constructed sets in order to claim the subsidies.  According to Cronenberg, he would spend mornings prior to filming writing scenes.

The film was shot primarily on-location in Montreal, Quebec; and Toronto, Ontario. The lecture scene was filmed at Concordia University, and the Charles J. Des Baillets Water Treatment Plant doubled as the 'Bicarbon Amalgamate' compound. The "Future Electronique" building in Vaudreuil-Dorion provided the exterior of 'ConSec' headquarters. The sequence of Revok (Michael Ironside) hijacking a car and causing another to crash were shot on Rue de la Commune. Additional scenes were filmed in the Yorkville neighborhood. However, since the United States dominated the film industry and Canadian films were being marketed for international audiences, the film downplays its Canadian origin in favor of a generic "North American" setting. The only indicators of its location are a scene of Revok and Keller meeting at the Yorkdale station of the Toronto subway and some visible bilingual signs.

Make-up artist Dick Smith (The Exorcist, Amadeus) provided prosthetics for the climactic scanner duel and the iconic exploding head effect.

Head explosion effect

The iconic head explosion scene was the product of trial and error, eventually settling on a plaster skull and a gelatin exterior packed with "latex scraps, some wax, and just bits and bobs and a lot of stringy stuff that we figured would fly through the air a little better" as well as "leftover burgers." When other explosive techniques failed to give the desired effect, special effects supervisor Gary Zeller told the crew to roll cameras and get inside the trucks with doors and windows closed; he then lay down behind the dummy and shot it in the back of the head with a shotgun.

Release
Scanners was released in the United States on January 14, 1981, by Avco Embassy Pictures, and grossed $2,758,147 from 387 theatres in its opening weekend. It grossed a total of $14,225,876 at the box office. A novelization by Leon Whiteson, David Cronenberg's Scanners, was also released in 1981.

Reception

Critical reception
The site's critical consensus reads, "Scanners is a dark sci-fi story with special effects that'll make your head explode." On Metacritic it has a weighted average score of 60% based on reviews from 8 critics, indicating "mixed or average reviews".
Film professor Charles Derry, in his overview of the  horror genre Dark Dreams, cited Scanners as "an especially important masterwork" and calling it the Psycho of its day. In a contemporary review for Ares Magazine, Christopher John commented that "Scanners is top-notch entertainment. It is haunting, exciting, shocking and literate – an unusual combination to discover in a film these days."

Some reviews were less positive. Film critic Roger Ebert gave Scanners two out of four stars and wrote, Scanners is so lockstep that we are basically reduced to watching the special effects, which are good but curiously abstract, because we don't much care about the people they're happening around". In his review for The New York Times, Vincent Canby wrote, "Had Mr. Cronenberg settled simply for horror, as John Carpenter did in his classic Halloween (though not in his not-so-classic The Fog), Scanners might have been a Grand Guignol treat. Instead he insists on turning the film into a mystery, and mystery demands eventual explanations that, when they come in Scanners, underline the movie's essential foolishness". John Simon of National Review described Scanners as trash.

A reassessment of Scanners in the 2012 issue of CineAction looks at the film in light of Cronenberg's use of allegory and parables in much of his work. The argument is made that Cronenberg uses iconic imagery that refers directly and indirectly to the thirty-something Scanners as 1960s political radicals, counterculture hippies, and as nascent Young Urban Professionals. As a result, the film can be seen "as an oblique reflection on what might happen when the counterculture becomes the dominant culture". Kim Newman noted in an essay for The Criterion Collection that at the same time the film rejects the conservative values of the 1980s and the nostalgia for the 1950s present in contemporary science-fiction films such as E.T. the Extra-Terrestrial and Back to the Future. The film's fictional drug ephemerol also mirrors the real-life thalidomide scandal, in which the popular West German medication thalidomide caused severe birth defects in children born to mothers prescribed the drug for morning sickness in Western Europe and Canada.

Accolades
Although Scanners was not nominated for any major awards, it did receive some recognition. The Academy of Science Fiction, Fantasy & Horror Films gave the film its Saturn Award in 1981 for "Best International Film", and, in addition, the "Best Make-Up" award went to Dick Smith in a tie with Altered States. The film had also been nominated for "Best Special Effects".

Scanners also won "Best International Fantasy Film" from Fantasporto in 1983, and was nominated for eight Genie Awards in 1982, but did not win any.

Soundtrack 
Mondo released the Howard Shore score for Scanners, alongside The Brood, on vinyl; it features cover art by Sam Wolfe Conelly.

Legacy
Scanners spawned sequels and a series of spin-offs; a remake was announced in 2007, but  had not gone into production. None of these projects has involved Cronenberg as director.

Sequels
 Scanners II: The New Order (1991)
 Scanners III: The Takeover (1992)

Spin-offs
 Scanner Cop (1994)
 Scanners: The Showdown (also known as Scanner Cop II) (1995)

Remake
In February 2007, Darren Lynn Bousman (director of Saw II, Saw III, and Saw IV) was announced as director of a remake of the film, to be released by The Weinstein Company and Dimension Films. David S. Goyer was assigned to script the film. The film was planned for release on October 17, 2008, but the date came and went without further announcements and all of the parties involved have since moved on to other projects. In an interview with Bousman in 2013, he recalled that he would not make the film without Cronenberg's approval, which was not granted.

Television series
Attempts to make a series include Dimension in 2011, Media Res and Bron Studios in 2017, and HBO, Media Res Studio, and Wayward Films in 2022.

References

Further reading
 "Scanners: Retro Classic Film No. 17" by Jonathan Hatfull, SciFiNow No. 77, pages 122–125. Discussion of the first film's story, actors, director, etc., and its production. Four pages, 10 photos including opening exploding head scene and final scene, large format British magazine; issue appeared on newsstands in the U.S. in March 2013.
 "Heads you lose: Scanners, Total Film, No. 213, December 2013, pages 140–141. Illustrated discussion (color photos and drawings) of the exploding head scene with comments by writer-director David Cronenberg, producer Pierre David, and actor Stephen Lack.
 "Explosions of Grandeur" by Michael Doyle, Rue Morgue Issue 146, July 2014, pages 30 – 32. Comments by Cronenberg and Lack on the difficulties of the production: unfinished script, motorist tragedy, and special effects of opening and closing scenes. Three pages, eight color photos, including behind-the-scenes.

External links
 
 
 
 
 
 Scanners: Mind and Matter an essay by Kim Newman at the Criterion Collection

Scanners (film series)
1981 films
1981 horror films
1981 action films
1981 independent films
1980s science fiction horror films
Canadian action horror films
Canadian independent films
Embassy Pictures films
English-language Canadian films
Film and television memes
Films directed by David Cronenberg
Films scored by Howard Shore
Films shot in Montreal
Films shot in Toronto
Internet memes
Fiction about mind control
Canadian science fiction action films
Films about telekinesis
Films about prejudice
Canadian science fiction horror films
Canadian body horror films
Films set in 1983
1980s English-language films
1980s Canadian films